Charles Henry Chandos Henniker-Major, 6th Baron Henniker, 3rd Baron Hartismere, DL (25 January 1872 – 4 February 1956) was a British peer and British army officer.

Background and education
Charles Henniker-Major was the second son of John Henniker-Major, 5th Baron Henniker, who with his wife Lady Alice Cuffe, the only daughter of the 3rd Earl of Desart, had twelve children. After education at Eton and RMC Sandhurst, Henniker-Major was commissioned into the British Army in 1891. He served on the North-West Frontier of India in 1897–1898 and by 1898 was a captain in the Rifle Brigade. In 1907 he was promoted to major in the 3rd Battalion, the Rifle Brigade. He served in the First World War from 1914 to 1918. He was a lieutenant-colonel of the Rifle Brigade, commanding Rifle Depot from 1917 to 1919.

Henniker-Major held the office of Justice of the Peace (J.P.) for East Suffolk and he was also a Deputy Lieutenant (D.L.) for the same county.

Lord Henniker, 5th Baron Henniker's eldest son died of pneumonia at age 35, and upon Lord Henniker's death in 1902 Charles Henniker-Major became the 5th Baron Henniker. He died unmarried in 1956 and was succeeded as Baron Henniker and Baron Hartismere by his brother John Ernest de Grey Henniker-Major, 7th baron.

The Thornham estate belonged to members of the Henniker-Major family since by its purchase in the 18th century by Sir John Major, 1st Baronet. In 1920 Charles Henniker-Major owned about 11,100 acres, after selling 21,000 acres in 1919 due to financial problems.

References

Book cited

External links 

1872 births
1956 deaths
Barons in the Peerage of the United Kingdom
Younger sons of barons
People educated at Eton College
Graduates of the Royal Military College, Sandhurst
Rifle Brigade officers
British Army personnel of World War I
Deputy Lieutenants of Suffolk
Barons Henniker